is a Japanese composer. Toyama is notable for creating music for Bikkuriman, Cyber City Oedo 808 and New Cutie Honey. He is sometimes credited as Kazz Toyama.

Music works
Aconcagua
Ai to ken Camelot: Mangaka Marina Time Slip
A Wind Named Amnesia
Bikkuriman
Chōjin Sentai Jetman
Crisis Core: Final Fantasy VII
Cyber City Oedo 808
Darkside Blues
Doomed Megalopolis
Eden's Bowy
Goku Midnight Eye
Goku II Midnight Eye
Idol Defense Force Hummingbird
New Cutie Honey
Ogre Slayer
Ozanari Dungeon: Kaze no Tou
Starship Girl Yamamoto Yohko
Tekken: The Motion Picture
Vampire Wars

External links
 
 

1956 births
Anime composers
Japanese film score composers
Japanese male film score composers
Living people
Musicians from Tokyo